Linda Uttley (26 October 1966 – 27 November 2009) was an English rugby union footballer.

She was born in Barnes, London and was the youngest of eight siblings. Her rugby career began in 1989 at Teddington Rugby Club. She moved to Wasps Rugby Club in 1995 and won her first international cap in 1997, the start of her career with the Women's England Team. She won a total of thirteen caps, playing in every position except full-back, hooker and prop, and was a member of the squads in the Five Nations and World Cup in 1998. She went on to play for the Classic Lionesses in Bermuda in 2000. Uttley loved everything about rugby – she was skillful, strong, fast and a great teammate. 

In November 2007 she was diagnosed with 'end-stage' leiomyosarcoma, a rare and aggressive cancer. Huge support from the rugby community raised funds for specialist treatment overseas. Despite her illness, she continued to work for the Rugby Football Union and toured with the England Lionesses. She died on 27 November 2009 at Princess Alice Hospice in Esher at the age of 43.

Since then, winners of the RFU Linda Uttley Award, in recognition of the commitment and dedication of an individual, have included 
Sophie Hemming and Catherine Spencer.

References

1966 births
2009 deaths
English rugby union players
England women's international rugby union players
English female rugby union players
Deaths from leiomyosarcoma